{{Infobox person
| name               = Prabhat Roy
| native_name        = প্রভাত রায়
| native_name_lang   = bn
| birth_place        = Jamshedpore, British India (present-day Jharkhand, India)
| birth_date         = 
| nationality        = Indian
| occupation         = Filmmaker
| notable_works      = {{ubl|Shwet Paatharer Thala|Sandhyatara|Pitribhumi|Lathi}}
| awards             = 
}}

Prabhat Roy (born 1946 in Jamshedpore) is a former Indian director who is known for his work in Bengali cinema.
He received several awards including two National Awards and BFJA Awards.

He began his career as an assistant director in the early 1970s. His directorial venture Pratidan'' (1983) was a box office success.

Awards

BFJA AWARD
ANANDOLOK AWARD
Lux ETV Award
 Kalakar Awards

Filmography

As a director 

 He also directed 16 telefilms & 3 TV Series.

Assistant Director

Actor
 Abhimanyu (1989)
 Amanush (1975)

References

External links
 
 Prabhat Roy at citwf
 Prabhat Roy at upperstall

1946 births
20th-century Indian film directors
21st-century Indian film directors
Bengali film directors
Directors who won the Best Film on Family Welfare National Film Award
Film directors from West Bengal
Hindi-language film directors
Living people
Film directors from Kolkata